Chikov is a rural locality (a khutor) in Zalivskoye Rural Settlement, Oktyabrsky District, Volgograd Oblast, Russia. The population was 375 as of 2010. There are 6 streets.

Geography 
The village is located on the left bank of the Aksay Yesaulovsky River.

References 

Rural localities in Oktyabrsky District, Volgograd Oblast